A bassoon concerto is a concerto for bassoon accompanied by a musical ensemble, typically orchestra. Like bassoon sonatas, bassoon concerti were relatively uncommon until the twentieth century, although there are quite a few bassoon concerti from the Classical period. Some contemporary bassoon concerti are scored for solo bassoon and wind or string orchestras.

Baroque

 Antonio Vivaldi, 39 Bassoon Concerti, RV 466-504 (RV 468 and 482 incomplete)
 Johann Friedrich Fasch, Concerto in C Major
 Caspar Förster, Concerto
 Johann Gottlieb Graun, Concerto in C Major
 Christoph Graupner, Four Bassoon Concerti in C Major, GWV 301, C Minor, GWV 307, G Major, GWV 328, and B-flat Major, GWV 340
 Johann Wilhelm Hertel, Bassoon Concerti in A Minor, B-flat Major and E-flat Major
 Franz Horneck, Concerto in E-flat Major
 František Jiránek, Bassoon Concerti in G Minor and F Major
 Antonín Jiránek, Four Bassoon Concerti
 , Concerto for Two Bassoons in G Major (1751)
 Johann Melchior Molter, Four Bassoon Concerti (including Concerto in B-flat Major, MWV 6.35)
 Antonín Reichenauer, Three Bassoon Concerti in C Major, F Major, and G Minor
 Michel Corrette, Concerto in D Major Le Phénix for four bassoons and continuo

Classical

 Johann Christian Bach, Two Bassoon Concerti in E flat Major (W C82) and B flat Major (W C83)
 Capel Bond, Bassoon Concerto No. 6 in B flat Major (1766)
 Bernhard Henrik Crusell, Bassoon Concertino in B flat Major
 Franz Danzi, Four Bassoon Concerti in F Major (2), C Major and G Minor
 François Devienne, Five Bassoon Concerti (1785)
 Luigi Gatti, Bassoon Concerto in F Major, L7:e4
 Johann Nepomuk Hummel, Bassoon Concerto in F Major, S. 63/WoO 23
 Leopold Kozeluch, Two Bassoon Concerti in B flat Major, P V:B1 and C Major, P V:C1
 Gustav Heinrich Kummer, Concerto in F Major
 Wolfgang Amadeus Mozart, Bassoon Concerto (1774)
 Johann Baptist Georg Neruda, Concerto in C Major
 Ignaz Joseph Pleyel, Concerto in B-flat Major B.107
 Johann Heinrich Christian Rinck, Concerto
 Antonio Rosetti, Bassoon Concerti (C69, C73-C75)
 Theodor von Schacht, Concerto
 Carl Stamitz, Bassoon Concerto in F Major
 Johann Baptist Wanhal, Bassoon Concerto in C Major, Concerto for Two Bassoons and Orchestra
 Anselm Viola i Valentí, Concerto in F Major (1791)
 Johann Christoph Vogel, Concerto in C Major

Romantic

 Ferdinand David, Concertino, Op. 12 (1838)
 Édouard Du Puy, Concerto in C Minor (also, Bassoon Quintet in A Minor, often performed as a concerto)
 Johann Nepomuk Fuchs, Concerto in B flat Major
 Peter Josef von Lindpaintner, Bassoon Concerto in F major, Op. 44
 Ludwig Milde, Concerto in A Minor
 Gioachino Rossini, Bassoon Concerto (attributed to Rossini, authenticity questionable)
 Carl Maria von Weber, Bassoon Concerto in F Major, Op. 75 (1811)
 Ermanno Wolf-Ferrari, Suite-concertino in F Major, Op. 16 (1932)

20th century

 Dieter Acker, Concerto (1979, rev. 1980)
 Murray Adaskin, Concerto (1960)
 , Concerto, Op. 69 (1995)
 , Concerto, Op. 75 (1956)
 David Amram, Concerto (1970)
 Jurriaan Andriessen, Concertino for Bassoon and Double Woodwind Quintet (1962)
 Allyson Applebaum, Concerto (1995)
 Tony Aubin, Concerto della Brughiera (1965)
 Conrad Baden, Concerto, Op. 126 (1980)
 Henk Badings, Concerto for Bassoon, Contrabassoon and Wind Orchestra (1964)
 Andrei Balanchivadze, Concertino (1954)
 Larry Bell, Concerto, Op. 45 The Sentimental Muse (1997)
 Richard Rodney Bennett, Concerto (1994)
 Alain Bernaud, Concertino da Camera (1962; completed 2012)
 Umberto Bertoni, Concerto (1954)
 , Concerto for Bassoon and Wind Ensemble
 Judith Bingham, Concerto (1998)
 Marcel Bitsch, Concertino for Bassoon and Orchestra (1948)
 Alexander Blechinger, Concerto, Op. 111
 Daniel Börtz, Concerto for Bassoon and Band (1978–79)
 Eugène Bozza, Concertino for Bassoon and Chamber Orchestra, Op. 49 (1946)
 Colin Brumby, Concerto
 Victor Bruns, Four Bassoon Concerti, Op. 5 (1933), Op. 15 (1946), Op. 41 (1966) and Op. 83 (1986), and Contrabassoon Concerto, Op. 98 (1992)
 Glenn Buhr, Concerto (1996)
 , Concertino, Op. 38 for bassoon, violin, viola and cello (1992)
 , Goëlette de jade Concerto for Bassoon and Strings (1999-2000)
 Wilson Coker, Concertino for Bassoon and String Trio (1959)
 Dinos Constantinides, Concerto, LRC 154a
 Andrzej Dobrowolski, Concerto (1953)
 Franco Donatoni, Concerto (1952)
 Pierre Max Dubois, Concerto Ironico (1968)
 Sophie Carmen Eckhardt-Gramatté, Triple-Concerto for Trumpet, Clarinet, Bassoon, Strings and Timpani, E. 123 (1949); Concerto for Bassoon and Orchestra, E. 124/125 (1950)
 Helmut Eder, Concerto, Op. 49
 Anders Eliasson, Concerto (1982)
 John Fairlie, Concerto
 Jindřich Feld, Concerto (1953)
 John Fernström, Concerto, Op. 80 (1945)
 Eric Fogg, Concerto (1931)
 Bjørn Fongaard, Concerto for Bassoon and Orchestra, Op. 120, No. 12; Concerto for Bassoon and Tape, Op. 131, No. 10
 Jean Françaix, Concerto for Bassoon and 11 String Instruments (1979)
 Stephen Frost, Concerto (1999, rev. 2004)
 Anis Fuleihan, Concertino (1965)
 , Concerto No. 1 (1979), Concerto No. 2 (1997)
 René Gerber, Concerto (1935–39)
 , Concerto (1979)
 Suzanne Giraud, Concerto Crier vers l'horizon (1991)
 , Concerto (1952); Concertino (1959)
 Launy Grøndahl, Concerto (1942)
 Sofia Gubaidulina, Concerto for Bassoon and Low Strings (1975)
 Bernhard Heiden, Concerto (1990)
 Kurt Hessenberg, Concertino, Op. 106 (1979)
 Jacques Hétu, Concerto (1979)
 Frigyes Hidas, Concerto for Bassoon and Wind Ensemble (1999)
 Paul Hindemith, Concerto for Bassoon and Trumpet (1949)
 Peter Hope, Concertino
 Bertold Hummel, Concerto, Op. 27b (1964/92)
 Gordon Jacob, Concerto (1947)
 André Jolivet, Concerto for Bassoon, String Orchestra, Harp and Piano (1951)
 John Joubert, Concerto, Op. 77 (1973)
 , Concerto, op. 27 (1981)
 Ernest Kanitz, Concerto (1962)
 Yuri Kasparov, Concerto (1996)
 Manfred Kelkel, Concerto, Op. 13 (1965)
 Ramaz Kemularia, Concerto (1969)
 Jānis Ķepītis, Concerto (1975)
 Carson Kievman, Concerto for Bassoon (and Fire Alarm System) for bassoon and percussion ensemble (1973)
 Lev Knipper, Double Concerto for Trumpet and Bassoon (1968), Concerto for Bassoon and Strings (1970)
 Rudolf Komorous, Chamber Concerto (1995)
 Nikolai Korndorf, Concerto Pastorale (1971)
 Uroš Krek, Concerto
 Hubert Kross, Concerto for 4 Bassoons and Orchestra(1987)
 Shin’ichirō Ikebe, Concerto “The License of Blaze” (1999 / rev. 2004)
 , Concerto (1997)
 Ezra Laderman, Concerto (1954)
 Marcel Landowski, Concerto for Bassoon and Strings (1957)
 Lars-Erik Larsson, Concertino, Op. 45, No. 4 (1955)
 Olof Lindgren, Concertino, Op. 56 (1986)
 Elizbar Lomdaridze, Concerto No. 1 (1971), Concerto No. 2 (1974)
 Ray Luke, Concerto for bassoon and orchestra or wind ensemble (1965)
 Anatoly Luppov, Concerto (1967)
 Mathieu Lussier, Double Concerto for Trumpet (or Flute) and Bassoon
 Ernst Mahle, Concertino (1980)
 Peter Maxwell Davies, Strathclyde Concerto No. 8 (1993)
 Jēkabs Mediņš, Concerto (1961)
 André Mehmari, Concerto for bassoon, harp and strings (2009)
 Chiel Meijering, "Neo-Geo" Concerto
 Francisco Mignone, Concertino (1957)
 , Concerto (1981)
 Vytautas Montvila, Concerto (1963)
 Oskar Morawetz, Concerto (1994)
 Saburō Moroi, Concerto, Op. 14 (1937) - lost
 , Concerto for Bassoon and Wind Band
 Akira Nishimura, Concerto for Bassoon, String and Percussion "Tapas" (1990)
 Jonas Novakauskas, Concerto (1970)
 Carmelo Pace, Concertino (1987)
 Andrzej Panufnik, Concerto (1985) (in memory of Jerzy Popiełuszko)
 Boris Papandopulo, Concerto
 Renato Parodi, Concerto (1952)
 Jiří Pauer, Concerto (1949)
 Johnterryl Plumeri, Concerto
 Arthur Polson, Concerto
 , Concerto (1977)
 Yuri Povolotsky, Concerto (1997)
 Stanojlo Rajičić, Concerto (1969)
 Primož Ramovš, Concerto piccolo
 Augusto Rattembach, Concierto con algo de Tango
 Alan Ridout, Concertino
 Jean Rivier, Concerto (1964)
 Nino Rota, Concerto (1974–77)
 Marcel Rubin, Concerto (1978)
 Harald Sæverud, Concerto, Op. 44 (1964)
 , Svensk (ångermanländsk) Concertino, Op. 114e (1982)
 Friedrich Schenker, Concerto (1970)
 Gunther Schuller, Concerto "Eine Kleine Fagottmusik" (1985)
 Antonio Scontrino, Concerto (1920)
 Maurice Shoemaker, Concerto (1947)
 Lucijan Marija Škerjanc, Concerto (1952)
 Thomas Sleeper, Concerto (1993)
 Gunnar Sønstevold, Concertino (1973)
 , Concerto (1944)
 Allan Stephenson, Concerto (1990), Concertino for Two Bassoons and Orchestra (1999)
 , Concerto (1985)
 Stjepan Šulek, Concerto (1958)
 Henri Tomasi, Concerto (1961)
 Yuzo Toyama, Concerto for Bassoon, Strings and Percussion (1982)
 Marc Vaubourgoin, Concerto (1968)
 Joseph Vella, Concerto Barocco, Op. 92 (1998)
 Enn Vetemaa, Concertino (1993)
 Stanley Weiner, Concerto, Op. 21 (1969)
 Arthur Weisberg, Concerto (1998)
 Alec Wilder, Air for Bassoon and Strings (1945)
 John Williams, The Five Sacred Trees (1995)
 Guy Woolfenden, Concerto (1999)
 Gerhard Wuensch, Concerto (1976)
 Takashi Yoshimatsu, Concerto “Unicorn Circuit” (1988)
 Boris Zeidman, Concerto (1938)
 León Zuckert, Concerto (1976)
 Ellen Taaffe Zwilich, Concerto (1992)

21st century

 Kalevi Aho, Concerto (2004)
 Mark Alburger, Concerto, Op. 120 (2004); Triple Concerto, Op. 201 (bn, cbn, hp, 2012)
 Tzvi Avni, Concerto (2002)
 John Baboukis, Three Walks in Zamalek (Concerto for bassoon, harpsichord, and strings)
 Ioseb Bardanashvili, Artiton (2010)
 David Beck, Concertino (c2003)
 Judith Bingham, Concerto Leonardo for Bassoon and Thirteen Strings (2012)
 Howard Blake, Concerto, op. 607 (2009)
 David Chesky, Concerto (2006)
 Benoît Dantin, Concerto Les Trois Étoiles (2012)
 Jack Curtis Dubowsky, Concerto (2005)
 Eric Ewazen, Concerto for Bassoon and Wind Ensemble (2002)
 , Concertino for Bassoon and Wind Ensemble (2002)
 Dai Fujikura, Concerto (2012)
 Michael Gandolfi, Concerto (2009)
 Aharon Harlap, Concerto (2004)
 Gregor Huebner, African Visions, Op. 23 for Bassoon and String Orchestra (2004)
 Caleb Hugo, Concerto (2009)
 David Ludwig, Pictures from the Floating World for Bassoon and Orchestra (2013)
 Jouni Kaipainen, Concerto, Op. 74 (2005)
 Tõnu Kõrvits, Teispool Päikesevälju (Beyond the Solar Fields) (2004); Concerto Vihma laulud vikerkaarele (Rain's Songs to the Rainbow) (2016)
 Claas Matti Julius Krause, Concerto for Bassoon and Chamber Orchestra (2016)
 Ülo Krigul, Concerto Goin''' (2014)
 Jeff Manookian, Concerto (2008)
 Per Mårtensson, Concerto (2002)
 Marjan Mozetich, Concerto for Bassoon and Strings with Marimba (2003)
 Nico Muhly, Reliable Sources, Concerto for Bassoon and Wind Ensemble / Orchestral Winds (2018)
 Marc Neikrug, Concerto (2013)
 Jaroslav Pelikán, Concertino: Variations for bassoon, string orchestra, harp and timpani (2000) 
 Jean-Louis Petit, Les Paradis Se Rencontrent, Ils Ne Se Fabriquent Pas Concertino for Bassoon and Mandolin Orchestra with Contrabass (2002), Concertino for Bassoon and Orchestra
 Nicole Philiba, Nuées Ardentes for Bassoon, Strings and Percussion (2001)
 Craig Phillips, Concerto (2002)
 Gene Pritsker, Concerto No. 1 Essentially Tragic for Amplified Bassoon and Chamber Orchestra (2001), Concerto No. 2 Breath of Rhetoric (2013)
 Wolfgang Rihm, Psalmus for bassoon and orchestra (2007)
 Christopher Rouse, Concerto (2018)
 Franklin Stover, Double Concerto for Bassoon, Contrabassoon and Orchestra (2010)
 Eino Tamberg, Concerto, Op. 108 (2000)
 Jerod Impichchaachaaha' Tate, Ghost of the White Deer: Concerto for Bassoon and Orchestra (2020)
 Christopher Theofanidis, Concerto (1997-2002)
 Augusta Read Thomas, Concertino (2013)
 Joan Tower, Red Maple for Bassoon and Strings (2013)
 Erkki-Sven Tüür, Concerto (2003)
 Gwyneth Walker, Concerto (2000)
 Kenneth Watson, Concerto (2015)

Other notable pieces for bassoon and orchestra include Berwald's Konzertstück, Elgar's Romance, Villa-Lobos's Ciranda Das Sete Notas, and Weber's Andante e Rondo Ongarese''.

See also

 Bassoon
 Bassoon sonata
 Bass oboe concerto
 Clarinet concerto
 English horn concerto
 Oboe concerto
 List of concert works for saxophone

References